Die Tageszeitung (“The Daily Newspaper”) is counted as being one of modern Germany's most important newspapers and amongst the top seven. taz is stylized as die tageszeitung and commonly referred to as taz, is a cooperative-owned German daily newspaper administrated by its employees and a co-operative of shareholders who invest in a free independent press, rather than to depend on advertising and, these days, pay-walls.  Founded in 1978 in Berlin as part of an independent, progressive and politically left-leaning movement, it has focused on current politics, social issues such as inequality, ecological crises both local and international, and other topics not covered by the more traditional and conservative newspapers. It mostly supports the alternative green political sphere and the German Green Party, but Die Tageszeitung has also been critical of the SPD/Greens coalition government (1998–2005).

It is being described as alternative-left and critical of existing current structures (systemkritisch).

The newspaper's logo, a paw print, derives from the similarity of the name "taz" to a German word for paw, Tatze. Its position in the Media landscape varies between the fifth and the sixth most read newspaper of Germany. In 2021 taz overtook for the first time the conservative Die Welt as the fifth most read daily newspaper of Germany.

History 
Die Tageszeitung was established in 1978. From the beginning, Die Tageszeitung was intended to be an alternative to the mainstream press, in its own words: "irreverent, commercially independent, intelligent and entertaining." One expression of its alternative approach to journalism was the payment of unified salaries for all employees until 1991. Nowadays, employees in highly responsible positions receive bonuses. Still, salaries paid by Die Tageszeitung are considerably lower than what is paid in the rest of the industry.

Since 1995, the WOZ Die Wochenzeitung (formerly WoZ) and Die Tageszeitung add a German-language edition of the monthly Le Monde diplomatique as a supplement of the newspapers.  Most of the articles in the monthly supplement are translations of the French language edition of the Le Monde diplomatique. When it existed, taz also added the Turkish language newspaper of Germany Perşembe.

Since 1992, Die Tageszeitung has been owned by currently more than 22,214 paying members (as of August 2022). Its circulation has dropped in recent years, with subscriptions including e-paper now down to 42,000. In 1995, it was the first German national newspaper to make all of the content of issue available online. Die Tageszeitung has announced that it will phase out its printed daily edition until 2022.

From the beginning, Die Tageszeitung appeared in a nationwide edition as well as in a Berlin local edition. Over the years, local editorial offices for North Rhine-Westphalia, Hamburg and Bremen were added. While the latter two were merged to "taz nord" (North) the NRW-offices were closed as of July 2007.

In the 2013 elections the magazine was among the supporters of the SPD.  taz was the first and only newspaper to have an independent Turkish language edition online, known as taz.gazete between 2017 and 2020. It also was amongst the first to have articles in simple German for neuro-diverse people. It publishes from time to time in English under taz in English.

"Potato Affair"
On 26 June 2006 Die Tageszeitung published a satirical article on its last page, headlined Die Wahrheit (the truth) that is reserved for satire and nonsense. It was titled Polens neue Kartoffel. Schurken, die die Welt beherrschen wollen. Heute: Lech „Katsche“ Kaczynski (The new potato of Poland. Rogues who want to rule the world. Today: Lech „Katsche“ Kaczynski). This article ridiculed the Polish politicians President of Poland Lech Kaczyński and Prime Minister of Poland Jarosław Kaczyński. Lech Kaczyński then cancelled talks that were scheduled between Germany, Poland and France (the Weimar Triangle), officially for reasons of sickness.

Headlines
The taz is noted for its tongue-in-cheek headlines, such as:
 Oh mein Gott! (Oh my god!) – On the election of Joseph Ratzinger as Pope Benedict XVI
 Es ist ein Mädchen (It's a girl) – On the election of Angela Merkel as the first female Chancellor of Germany
 Oops – they did it again! – On the re-election of George W. Bush as President of the United States

On 5 June 2008, the paper published a picture headlined "Onkel Baracks Hütte" (Uncle Barack's Cabin) with a picture of the White House below the headline as part of an article about then-Senator Barack Obama. That headline, which made reference to the book Uncle Tom's Cabin, was perceived as racist by some of its readership.

See also

 List of newspapers in Germany
 Friede sei mit Dir
 Die Datenschleuder
Bascha Mika

Footnotes

Literature
 taz -  die tageszeitung. Die Tageszeitung Verlagsgenossenschaft e. G., Berlin 1.1987,1ff.  
 Oliver Tolmein/Detlef zum Winkel: tazsachen. Kralle zeigen - Pfötchen geben. Hamburg 1988.  
 Jörg Magenau: Die taz. Eine Zeitung als Lebensform. München 2007, 
 Nora Münz: Links und liebenswert. Nutzungsmotive von Lesern der tageszeitung (taz). In: Senta Pfaff-Rüdiger / Michael Meyen (Hg.): Alltag, Lebenswelt und Medien. Lit Verlag. Münster 2007. S. 215–235.

External links
taz website (in German)

 
1978 establishments in West Germany
Anti-capitalist organizations
Cooperatives in Germany
Daily newspapers published in Germany
Feminist organisations in Germany
German-language newspapers
German news websites
Green politics
Left-wing newspapers
Media cooperatives
New Left
Newspapers established in 1978
Newspapers published in Berlin
Progressivism in Germany